The name Vince or Vincent has been used for four tropical cyclones worldwide, one in the Atlantic Ocean and three in the Australian region of the South-East Indian Ocean.

In the Atlantic:
 Hurricane Vince (2005) – formed southeast of the Azores, made landfall on the Iberian Peninsula as a tropical depression

In the Australian region:
 Cyclone Vincent (1990) – paralleled the coast of Western Australia
 Cyclone Vincent (2001) – made landfall in Western Australia as a tropical low
 Cyclone Vince (2011) – formed and remained off the coast of Western Australia

Atlantic hurricane set index articles